William Hotchkiss may refer to:
 William O. Hotchkiss, president of Michigan Technological University and president of Rensselaer Polytechnic Institute
 William Hotchkiss III, Philippine Air Force general 
 William Horace Hotchkiss, author of legal textbooks on bankruptcy law